Back is a small lunar impact crater that is located near the eastern limb of the Moon. It lies on the northwest edge of the Mare Smythii, and the northeast rim is adjacent to the crater Schubert. To the west is Jenkins, and to the southwest is the Weierstrass–Van Vleck crater pair.

Back is nearly circular, with narrow, sharp-edged outer walls that are not significantly worn.  Despite its relatively small size, Back has a central peak typical of larger craters.

Back was formally named by the IAU in 1976.  It was previously known as Schubert B.

References

External links
 

Impact craters on the Moon